Birth of the B-29 was a 1945 propaganda film commissioned by the US War Department. As the name implies, it concerned the production of the B-29 Superfortress bomber and its use in the aerial bombing of Japan in World War II.

Opening amid scenes of volcanic eruptions, the narrator gives a brief description of the Japanese and their warlike nature, mentioning such concepts as bushido, Hakko ichiu, and Shinto, and states the belief that everything comes from the sky. The Americans are building a devastating new weapon that will be able to travel vast distances and drop giant payloads of bombs on the Japanese mainland: the B-29.

The manufacturing of Superfortresses in huge factories is then chronicled, as Americans from every walk of life, black, white, male and female, work together to assemble the giant airplanes, each one larger than the Mayflower. The creation of the bomber is the product of all of their work, as well as the work of the miners and lumberjacks who supplied the raw material, the people who bought war bonds, and the servicemen who died so that the workers could have the time to build it.

Soon the Twentieth Air Force is created and the planes are flown to China, where the Americans' allies are happy to build airfields to help defeat the common enemy. The film ends with a B-29 taking off and the narrator saying, "Next stop - Japan!"

See also
List of Allied propaganda films of World War II

External links
 
 

1945 films
American World War II propaganda shorts
Documentary films about military aviation
Films about the United States Army Air Forces
Boeing B-29 Superfortress
American black-and-white films
Articles containing video clips
United States government films
American documentary films
1945 documentary films
American war films
1940s war films
1940s American films